Henryk Chmielewski may refer to:

Henryk Chmielewski (comics) (born 1923), Polish comic book artist
Henryk Chmielewski (boxer) (1914–1998), Polish Olympic boxer